Madame Victorine (19th-century), was a French fashion designer couturier.

Madame Victorine was initially a student and business partner of the famous Madame Guérin, an elite milliner of the Bourbon Restoration.

She was an established fashion designer during the Bourbon Restoration and the July Monarchy. She enjoyed a successful career, came to have an influential position within the French fashion industry and was amongst the elite fashion designers in Paris, and was perhaps the most noted fashion designer in Paris in the 1830s, alongside Madame Palmyre, Madame Oudot-Manoury and Beaudran.

She was a favorite milliner of Queen Victoria.

She is referenced several times as the top Paris seamstress in the fiction of Balzac.

References

French fashion designers
French milliners
19th-century French businesswomen
19th-century French businesspeople
Year of birth missing
Year of death missing
People of the Bourbon Restoration
People of the July Monarchy
Queen Victoria
French women fashion designers